Girls, Please! is a 1934 British comedy film directed by Jack Raymond and starring Sydney Howard, Jane Baxter, Meriel Forbes and Peter Gawthorne. It was made at British and Dominion's Elstree Studios. In the film, a physical education teacher at a girls school is left in charge when the headmistress is absent, and has to confront the elopement of one of the pupils.

Cast
 Sydney Howard as Trampleasure
 Jane Baxter as Renée van Hoffenheim
 Meriel Forbes as Ann Arundel
 Edward Underdown as Jim Arundel
 Peter Gawthorne as Van Hoffenheim
 Lena Halliday as Miss Prout
 Cicely Oates as Miss Kinter
 Sybil Arundale as Matron
 Moore Marriott as Oldest Inhabitant

References

Bibliography
 Low, Rachael. Filmmaking in 1930s Britain. George Allen & Unwin, 1985.
 Wood, Linda. British Films, 1927-1939. British Film Institute, 1986.

External links

1934 films
1934 comedy films
British comedy films
1930s English-language films
Films directed by Jack Raymond
British black-and-white films
British and Dominions Studios films
Films shot at Imperial Studios, Elstree
Films scored by Percival Mackey
1930s British films